Syringaresinol is a lignan found in Castela emoryi, in Prunus mume.

This compound inhibits Helicobacter pylori motility in vitro.

References 

Lignans